Green Bus may refer to:

Green Bus Lines, in New York, U.S.
Chiba Green Bus, Chiba Prefecture, Japan
Kantetsu Green Bus, Ibaraki Prefecture, Japan
The Green Bus
,Birmingham,Great Britain